Noctepuna cerea is a species of air-breathing land snail, a terrestrial pulmonate gastropod mollusc in the family Camaenidae. This species is endemic to Australia.

Description
Charles Hedley's original description of this species (based solely on the shell) is as follows:

References
This article incorporates public domain text from the reference

External links 
 

Camaenidae
Gastropods described in 1894